Pyotr Ivanovich Evdóshenko (~1890 – nearly 1920) is considered to be as one of the prominent poets of the Silver Age.

Life 

Pyotr Evdoshenko was born in the city of Pyriatyn, Poltava Governorate of The Russian Empire, into the family of employees. His father, Ivan Evdoshenko, was the trustee (abbot) of all educational institutions of the entire county. Pyotr’s sister, Catherine, also chose to work in the field of education (she taught Russian language), later she was granted the title of Honored Schoolteacher.

Pyotr Evdoshenko was on good friendly terms with Andrei Bely and Igor Severyanin. 

Evdoshenko died of tuberculosis before he was even 30 years old.

Literary career 

Pyotr Evdoshenko is an author of the poetry collection “Cascade Splashes” (1917, Pyriatyn). The first edition was issued in the city of Pyriatyn, Poltava Governorate, and that copy is kept in the National Library of Russia in Saint Petersburg. In 2007 the book was republished in Moscow.

Manuscripts of several poems are kept in Russian State Archive of Literature and Art. They are held in the collection of bibliographer, literary critic and historian , who is also the chairman of the board of cooperative publishing house .

On the basis of Evdoshenko’s poems Lilacs in bloom (Сирень цветёт), On a golden day (В золотистый день) and Suddenly (Вдруг) were shot several art-viedos.

Poetry collections

References

Works cited

External links 
  by Pyotr Evdoshenko

Russian male poets
Russian symbolism
Symbolist poets
20th-century Russian poets
20th-century Russian male writers